The following are the association football events of the year 1885 throughout the world.

Events 
During the summer of 1885, there was pressure put on the Football Association to accept professionalism in English football, culminating in a special meeting on 20 July, after which it was announced that it was "in the interests of Association Football, to legalise the employment of professional football players, but only under certain restrictions". Clubs were allowed to pay players provided that they had either been born or had lived for two years within a six-mile radius of the ground. There were also rules preventing professional players playing for more than one club in a season, without obtaining special permission, and all professional players had to be registered with the F.A.

12 September: Arbroath F.C. beat Bon Accord F.C. (of Aberdeen) 36-0, a record which stands to this day. On the same day, Dundee Harp beat Aberdeen Rovers 35-0.

Clubs founded in 1885

Denmark
Aalborg BK

England
Bromsgrove Rovers F.C.
Bury F.C.
Chester City F.C.
Hailsham Town F.C.
Kingstonian F.C.
Lewes F.C.
Luton Town F.C.
Millwall Rovers F.C.
Southampton F.C.

Scotland
Dunfermline Athletic F.C.
St Johnstone F.C.

Domestic cups

International tournaments
1884–85 British Home Championship (28 February – 11 April 1885)

Births
 20 February – George Wall (d. 1962), England international forward in seven matches (1907–1913), scoring two goals.
 21 April – Harry Hampton (d. 1963), England international forward in four matches (1913–1914), scoring two goals.
 15 May – Jimmy Brownlie (d. 1973), Scotland international goalkeeper in sixteen matches (1909–1914).
 9 July – Caius Welcker (d. 1939), Netherlands international forward in fifteen matches (c. 1908), scoring five goals.
 10 August – George Hilsdon (d. 1941), England international forward in eight matches (1907–1909), scoring fourteen goals.
 10 September – Albert Shepherd (d. 1929), England international forward in two matches (1906–1911), scoring two goals.
 1 October – Bert Freeman (d. 1955), England international forward in five matches (1909–1912), scoring three goals.
 20 November – George Holley (d. 1942), England international forward in ten matches (1909–1913), scoring eight goals.
 21 November – Robert Evans (d. 1965), international forward for both Wales (ten matches; 1906–1910) and England (four matches; 1911–1912).

References